Father Joe Devlin was one of the three American Jesuits during the Vietnam War that went to Vietnam and helped the refugees. He was important in securing the passage of several thousand Cambodian refugees to America. He built an orphanage in Thailand which housed, fed, and schooled several hundred abandoned children.

After his death, Father Joe's brother wrote his biography which he entitled 
"Cha".

Early life
When Joe was growing up, his family lived at 431 Jersey St. in San Francisco, a few blocks from church, and also a few blocks from the local library.

References

"Cha"
Author: Raymond A. Devlin
Title: Cha
Copyright (c) 2001 by Raymond A. Devlin

External links
 Father Joe

20th-century American Jesuits
Roman Catholic missionaries in Vietnam
American Roman Catholic missionaries
Year of death missing
Year of birth missing
Roman Catholic missionaries in Thailand
Jesuit missionaries
American expatriates in Vietnam
American expatriates in Thailand
Clergy from San Francisco
Catholics from California